Millançay is a French commune in the Loir-et-Cher department, Centre-Val de Loire.

Population

See also
Communes of the Loir-et-Cher department

References

Communes of Loir-et-Cher